
Gmina Godziesze Wielkie is a rural gmina (administrative district) in Kalisz County, Greater Poland Voivodeship, in west-central Poland.

Villages
Gmina Godziesze Wielkie contains the villages and settlements of Bałdoń, Biała, Borek, Godziesze Małe, Godziesze Wielkie, Godzieszki, Józefów, Kakawa-Kolonia, Kąpie, Końska Wieś, Kopie, Krzemionka, Nowa Kakawa, Rafałów, Saczyn, Skrzatki, Stara Kakawa, Stobno, Stobno Siódme, Takomyśle, Wola Droszewska, Wolica, Zadowice, Zajączki Bankowe and Żydów.

Neighbouring gminas
Gmina Godziesze Wielkie is bordered by the city of Kalisz and by the gminas of Brzeziny, Nowe Skalmierzyce, Opatówek, Sieroszewice and Szczytniki.

References
Polish official population figures 2006

Godziesze Wielkie
Kalisz County